Bluejacket, or Blue Jacket may refer to:

People
 Another term for naval rating, a junior enlisted sailor in a navy
 Blue Jacket (1745–1810), Shawnee war chief known for his defense of Shawnee lands in the Ohio Country
 Charles Blue Jacket (1817–1897), 19th-century Shawnee chief in Kansas, and Methodist Minister
 Jim Bluejacket (1887–1947), one of the first Native Americans to play in major league baseball
 Jimmy Smith (baseball, born 1895) (1895–1974), major league infielder often referred to as Bluejacket

Geographic
 Bluejacket, Oklahoma
 Blue Jacket Creek, a stream in Ohio
 the original 1777 settlement at the site of present-day Bellefontaine, Ohio

Sailboats
Bluejacket 23, a Canadian sailboat design
Bluejacket MS 23, a Canadian motorsailer design

Ships
 , an 1854 clipper ship in the Liverpool and Australia trade
 , the name of several U.S. Navy ships

Other
 The Bluejacket's Manual, the basic handbook for U.S. Navy personnel
 The Bluejackets, a 1922 Dutch film
 Columbus Blue Jackets, a professional ice hockey team in the National Hockey League based in Columbus, Ohio
 Tradescantia ohiensis, a plant known by the common name "bluejacket"